Nadia Akpana Assa (born 22 December 1995 in Oslo) is a Norwegian athlete specialising in the long jump. She won the silver medal at the 2014 World Junior Championships. Her parents came to Norway from Togo in the mid-1980s.

Her personal bests in the event are 6.53 metres outdoors (+0.4 m/s, Copenhagen 2016) and 6.37 metres indoors (Bærum 2016).

International competitions

References

1995 births
Living people
Norwegian people of Togolese descent
Norwegian female long jumpers
Athletes from Oslo
21st-century Norwegian women